Vladimir Anatolyevich Fedorov or Fyodorov (born 22 April 1971) is a Russian former competitive ice dancer. He is the 1993 World bronze medalist with Anjelika Krylova. He is now married and lives in the USA in illinois. He coaches at SnoKing Ice Arena in Snoqualmie, WA.

Career
Fedorov originally competed for the Soviet Union with partner Liudmila Berezova. They won the silver medal at the 1989 World Junior Championships.

When that partnership ended, he teamed up with Anjelika Krylova. They took the bronze medal at the 1993 World Championships. They competed at the 1994 Winter Olympics and placed 6th. Their partnership ended following that season.

Fedorov teamed up with Anna Semenovich in 1995. They won the Finlandia Trophy twice and competed on the Grand Prix of Figure Skating. The highlight of their partnership was competing at the 1998 World Championships, where they placed 15th.

Fedorov retired after that and began working as a coach. He has worked with Melinda Wang.

He has also worked with Isabelle Inthisone

Results
GP = Part of Champions Series from 1995; renamed Grand Prix in 1998

With Semenovich

With Krylova

With Berezova

References 

Russian male ice dancers
Soviet male ice dancers
Olympic figure skaters of Russia
Figure skaters at the 1994 Winter Olympics
Figure skaters from Moscow
1971 births
Living people
World Figure Skating Championships medalists
World Junior Figure Skating Championships medalists